Biddy or Biddie is a given name which may refer to:

People 
 Biddy Anderson (1874–1926), South African cricketer
 Biddy Baxter (born 1933), English television producer
 Biddy Dolan (1881–1950), American Major League Baseball player
 Biddy Early (c. 1798–1874), Irish traditional healer
 Biddy Hodson, stage name of Bridget Hodson, British actress
 Gertrude Macdonald or Biddy Jamieson (1871–1952), English painter
 Carolyn Martin (born 1951), nicknamed "Biddy", president of Amherst College
 Biddy Mason (1818–1891), African American nurse, entrepreneur, and philanthropist
 Biddy Rockman Napaljarri (born c. 1940), indigenous Australian artist
 Biddy O'Sullivan, Irish former camogie player
 Biddy White Lennon (1946–2017), Irish actress and food writer

Fictional characters 

 Biddy, in the novel Great Expectations by Charles Dickens
 Biddy Paget, in the crime novel Mystery Mile by Margery Allingham
 Biddy Byrne, a protagonist in Glenroe, an Irish television drama
 Biddie Cloom, in Here Come the Brides, an American television series
 Biddy Mulligan, played by Jimmy O'Dea, an Irish actor and comedian

Sports 
Biddy Basketball a type of basketball games played by youth

See also
 Bridget (given name), of which Biddy is a contraction
 Biddie (steamboat) – see Steamboats on Lake Coeur d'Alene
 Acaena novae-zelandiae or biddy-biddy, an ornamental plant
 Silver biddy, a fish

Lists of people by nickname